Svenzea zeai is a species of sponge belonging to the family Scopalinidae, first described in 1998 as Pseudaxinella zeai. The species epithet, zeai, honours the Colombian spongiologist Sven Zea who first collected it.

It is found in the West Atlantic Ocean, and is a common sponge of off-shore reefs in the Caribbean

il produces the largest embryos and larvae so far recorded for sponges.

References

External links
Svenzea zeai: images & occurrence data

Heteroscleromorpha
Animals described in 1998
Taxa named by Rob van Soest